Andrés Norberto Cruz Carrasco (born 4 June 1974) is a Chilean lawyer who was elected as a member of the Chilean Constitutional Convention.

References

External links
 BCN Profile

Living people
1967 births
21st-century Chilean politicians
University of Concepción alumni
Members of the Chilean Constitutional Convention
People from Arica
University of Salamanca alumni